Lyndell Hans Petersen (born July 4, 1931) is an American former politician. He served in the South Dakota Senate from 1977 to 1994.

References

1931 births
Living people
People from Sheridan County, Nebraska
People from Rapid City, South Dakota
Republican Party South Dakota state senators